Ness Nissim Zamir (born 31 October 1990) is an Israeli professional footballer who plays for Israeli Premier League side Hapoel Hadera. Zamir also played for the Israel under-21 national football team.

Club career

Early years
Zamir progressed through the youth ranks of clubs in Israel. When he was only 17 years old, Zamir had a trial with Getafe B, which decided to sign him on a professional contract. After playing there in the Segunda División B Groups 1–4, Zamir signed with Albacete B. A number of great games drew the attraction of some La Liga clubs such as Atlético Madrid, with whom he agreed terms on a multi-year contract.  However, the transfer was put on hold and eventually avoided due to issues with Zamir receiving recognition from the IDF allowing him to be exempt from compulsory military service as an 'elite athlete'.  Zamir is also awaiting a Spanish passport.

Real Zaragoza
On 28 July 2011, Zamir signed with Real Zaragoza on a four-year contract.  A key factor in Zamir's decision to sign with Zaragoza was the fact that their football director, Juan Esnáider, knew Zamir well from when he was an assistant coach at Getafe.

Maccabi Petah Tikva
On 30 January 2012, due to his continued failure to receive the status as an 'elite athlete' from the IDF, Zamir signed on a four-month loan deal with Israeli Premier League side Maccabi Petah Tikva.  It was hoped that this move would satisfy the military authorities as to Zamir's abilities and pave the way for him to become an 'elite athlete'.  On 4 February 2012, Zamir made his debut for Petah Tikva as an 80th-minute substitute in their league match against Maccabi Tel Aviv.  Zamir played a key role in Petah Tikva's second goal, which turned out to be the winning goal in the 2–1 result.

Hapoel Haifa
Zamir signed for Hapoel Haifa in July 2018.

International career
On 23 March 2011, Zamir made his debut for the Israel under-21 national football team in a friendly tournament against Georgia in the Austrian town of Sankt Veit.  He came on as a 57th-minute substitute for Mohammad Ghadir, scoring six minutes into his debut.  Israel won this match 2–0.

References

External links
 Israel FA league player profile 
 Israel FA national team player profile 
 
 

1990 births
Living people
Israeli footballers
Footballers from Rishon LeZion
Beitar Nes Tubruk F.C. players
Atlético Albacete players
Getafe CF B players
Real Zaragoza B players
Maccabi Petah Tikva F.C. players
Bnei Yehuda Tel Aviv F.C. players
Beitar Jerusalem F.C. players
Hapoel Rishon LeZion F.C. players
Hapoel Petah Tikva F.C. players
Hapoel Haifa F.C. players
Sektzia Ness Ziona F.C. players
Hapoel Hadera F.C. players
Segunda División B players
Tercera División players
Israeli Premier League players
Liga Leumit players
Israeli expatriate footballers
Expatriate footballers in Spain
Israeli expatriate sportspeople in Spain
Israel under-21 international footballers
Association football midfielders